Baisguri is a census town in the Cooch Behar II CD block in the Cooch Behar Sadar subdivision of the Cooch Behar district  in the state of West Bengal, India.

Geography

Location

Area overview
The map alongside shows the north-central part of the district. It has the highest level of urbanisation in an overwhelming rural district. 22.08% of the population of the Cooch Behar Sadar subdivision lives in the urban areas and 77.92% lives in the rural areas. The entire district forms the flat alluvial flood plains of mighty rivers.
 
Note: The map alongside presents some of the notable locations in the subdivision. All places marked in the map are linked in the larger full screen map.

Demographics
As per the 2011 Census of India, Baisguri had a total population of 5,021.  There were 2,577 (51%) males and 2,444 (49%) females. There were 518 persons in the age range of 0 to 6 years. The total number of literate people in Baisguri was 3,844 (85.37% of the population over 6 years).

Infrastructure
According to the District Census Handbook 2011, Koch Bihar, Baisguri covered an area of 1.5618 km2. Among the civic amenities, the protected water supply involved  overhead tank, tap water from treated sources, hand pumps. It had 483  electric connections. Among the medical facilities it had 1 hospital. Among the educational facilities it had 2  primary schools, 2 middle schools, 1 secondary school, 1 senior secondary school. It had the branch offices of 1 nationalised bank, 1 non- agricultural credit society.

References

Cities and towns in Cooch Behar district